Kosovo became an associate member of the Organisation internationale de la Francophonie in 2014 and subsequently made its debut at the Jeux de la Francophonie in 2017.

Medal count
Kosovo first competed in the Jeux de la Francophonie in 2017.

By sport

List of medallists

See also
Kosovo at the Olympics
Kosovo at the Youth Olympics
Kosovo at the European Games
Kosovo at the Mediterranean Games
Kosovo at the Universiade
Sport in Kosovo

References

External links
Kosovo profile at the Jeux de la Francophonie

Jeux de la Francophonie
Kosovo at multi-sport events